Francisco Verdín y Molina (died April 29, 1675) was a Roman Catholic prelate who served as Bishop of Michoacán (1673–1675) and Bishop of Guadalajara (1665–1673).

Biography
On May 30, 1665, Francisco Verdín y Molina was appointed by the King of Spain and confirmed by Pope Alexander VII as Bishop of Guadalajara. On June 27, 1666, he was consecrated bishop by Marcos Ramírez de Prado y Ovando, Bishop of Michoacán. On November 27, 1673, he was appointed by the King of Spain and confirmed by Pope Clement X as Bishop of Michoacán. He served as Bishop of Michoacán until his death on April 29, 1675.

While bishop of Guadalajara, he was the principal Consecrator of Francisco Antonio Sarmiento de Luna y Enríquez, Bishop of Michoacán.

References

External links and additional sources
 (for Chronology of Bishops)
 (for Chronology of Bishops)
 (for Chronology of Bishops) 
 (for Chronology of Bishops) 

1675 deaths
Bishops appointed by Pope Alexander VII
Bishops appointed by Pope Clement X
17th-century Roman Catholic bishops in Mexico